Łukasz Mierzejewski (born 31 August 1982) is a Polish football coach and a former player who is the manager of Avia Świdnik.

Career

Club
He was released from Cracovia on 15 July 2011. Then, he joined Greek side Kavala on 11 August 2011 and returned to Poland for Podbeskidzie Bielsko-Biała on 29 December 2011.

International
In 1999, he played at the FIFA U-17 World Championship tournament. In 2000 Mierzejewski played at the UEFA European Under-16 Football Championship tournament. In 2001, he won UEFA European Under-18 Football Championship with Poland national under-18 football team.

Now he is a part of Poland national football team.

References

External links
 
  

1982 births
Living people
People from Ciechanów
Sportspeople from Masovian Voivodeship
Polish footballers
Legia Warsaw players
ŁKS Łódź players
Świt Nowy Dwór Mazowiecki players
Zagłębie Lubin players
Widzew Łódź players
MKS Cracovia (football) players
Kavala F.C. players
Podbeskidzie Bielsko-Biała players
Ekstraklasa players
HNK Rijeka players
Górnik Łęczna players
Croatian Football League players
Polish expatriate footballers
Expatriate footballers in Greece
Polish expatriate sportspeople in Greece
Expatriate footballers in Croatia
Polish expatriate sportspeople in Croatia
Association football forwards
Poland international footballers
Polish football managers
Avia Świdnik managers